Ceratostema alatum is a species of Ceratostema found in Ecuador.

References

External links

alatum
Plants described in 1935